Sooke School District 62 is a school district in British Columbia, Canada.  It includes the suburbs of Victoria known as the Western Communities (or WestShore) as well as the mostly rural areas around the sea-side villages of Sooke and Port Renfrew. The District's Victoria suburbs include the municipalities of Colwood, Highlands, Langford, and parts of Metchosin.

In addition to a full range of academic offerings, the District is also home to the Sooke International Student Program, one of the first international student programs in all of British Columbia. The Sooke International Program enrolls students from South America, Europe and Asia. These students represent under 1% of the District's total student population.

History

The school district in what today is the western suburbs of Victoria predates the formation of the Canadian province of British Columbia in mid 1871.  The Metchosin School District was formed April 8, 1871.  The Sooke School District was formed 23 May 1872 as one of the first school districts of the new province.   The Highlands School District was formed in 1893 and incorporated into the SSD in 1952.

Schools

See also
List of school districts in British Columbia

References

62